Yarah Bravo is a singer-songwriter, rapper, poet, beatmaker. Bravo was born to a Chilean mother and a Brazilian father, who came to Sweden as political refugees. She sings and raps in English, Swedish and Spanish. 

She is most known for the song Bluebird with the group One Self and for her EPs Love Is The Movement and Good Girls Rarely Make History. Bravo was one of the MC’s of the group One Self, alongside BluRum13. Their debut album was released in 2005 titled Children of Possibility on the record label Ninja Tune.

Early days

Yarah Bravo started writing as a young teenager, as a way to handle her parents' breakup. She formed her first group at 16 years old: it was an all-girl group called B.o.B. She was part of the hip hop scene in her hometown, Lund, in the 90s. She moved to London as a teenager, at age 18. 

Bravo has throughout her career focused on highlighting other female talents and has many times had an all-female band on stage, bringing together up and coming artist for international tours.

Career
In 2008 she curated U.N.I.T.Y the all-female stage at Hip Hop Kemp Festival, with Roxane Shante, Bahamadia, Invincible, Dj Shorty, Stacy Epps, Eternia, Cleo Missaoui, Syster Sol, Vaitea, Darshania and others.
Bravo has collaborated with many artists, including Fat Freddys Drop, French experimental hip hop group TTC (Big Dada) and Polish Jazz duo Skalpel (Ninja Tune), Gavlyn, Organized Threat, The Polish Ambassador, Mykah 9, Abstract Rude, Aceyalone, Figub, Miss ill, The Electric, The Nextmen, Rodney P, Dynamite Mc, and Kidkanevil, Anna The Unused word.

She has worked with and shared the stage with some notables: Talib Kweli, Manu Chao, Grand Master Flash, Mos Def, Roots Manuva, De La Soul, The Herbaliser, The Gotan Project. 

Yarah Bravo has toured the world several times with different artists and constellations. And performed at many festivals including Roskilde, Splash Festival, Fusion Festival, Gilles Peterson's Worldwide Festival - Sète, Soundwave Croatia, Electric Castle, Open'er Festival.

In 2011 Yarah went into fashion for a short period of time and opened a pop up boutique shop "The Captain Love Bubble" in London, Shoreditch, together with Mimi Fresh (stylist to Erykah Badu) and fellow hip hop artist Sheila Mukasa.

Bravo has lived in Sweden, England, the United States and Germany.

Discography

Studio albums
According to Discogs and MusicBrainz, Yarah Bravo has released two albums:
 Good Girls Rarely Make History  (Mothergrain Records, 2008)
 Love Is The Movement  (Duzz Down San, 2014)

Collaborative albums
 Children Of Possibility with One Self  (Ninja Tune 2005)
 Organically Grown with One Self   (Mothergrain Records / OGS 2006)

Collaborations
 One Self – Be Your Own (Ninja Tune, 2005)
 One Self – Bluebird (Ninja Tune, 2005)
 One Self – Paranoid / Over Expose (Ninja Tune, 2005)
 Skalpel feat Yarah Bravo – Voice of Reason (Ninja Tune)
 Dj Vadim feat Yarah Bravo – The Pacifist (Ninja Tune)
 Dj Vadim feat Yarah Bravo – She Who Is Tested (Ninja Tune)
 Dj Vadim feat Yarah Bravo – Cum Shots (Ninja Tune)
 Dj Vadim feat Yarah Bravo – You are Yours (Ninja Tune)
 The Electric feat Yarah Bravo – Beautiful (BBE Records)
 The Polish Ambassador feat Yarah Bravo – Nobody's Alone
 Paco Mendoza feat Yarah Bravo – Candela

References

Living people
Swedish women rappers
Swedish singer-songwriters
Place of birth missing (living people)
Year of birth missing (living people)